Nicotiana rustica, commonly known as Aztec tobacco or strong tobacco, is a rainforest plant in the family Solanaceae.  It is a very potent variety of tobacco, containing up to nine times more nicotine than common species of Nicotiana such as Nicotiana tabacum (common tobacco). More specifically, N. rustica leaves have a nicotine content as high as 9%, whereas N. tabacum leaves contain about 1 to 3%. The high concentration of nicotine in its leaves makes it useful for producing pesticides, and it has a wide variety of uses specific to cultures around the world. However, N. rustica is no longer cultivated in its native North America, (except in small quantities by certain Native American tribes) as N. tabacum has replaced it.

Uses

South America
Nicotiana rustica is called mapacho in South America. It is often used for entheogenic purposes by South American shamans, because of its high nicotine content and comparatively high levels of beta-carbolines, including the harmala alkaloids harmane and norharmane. There are many methods of administration in South American ethnobotanical preparations. In a preparation known as singado or singa, N. rustica is allowed to soak or be infused in water, and the water is then insufflated into the stomach. In Peru its known as "Mapacho"  and smoked in pipes, the juice is also drunk for its hallucinogenic effects. The plant is also smoked in cigars, used in enemas, and made into a lickable product known as ambil. Finally, N. rustica is a common ingredient in rapé, a smokeless tobacco product usually used as a nasal snuff. Rapé is often a combination of N. rustica and a host of other herbs, depending on the intended use, including tonka beans, cinnamon, clove buds, alkaline ashes (creating nu-nu), Anadenanthera, Erythroxylum, Virola, and more.

Russia
In Russia, N. rustica is called makhorka (маxорка). Historically, makhorka was smoked mainly by the lower classes. N. rustica is a hardy plant and can be grown in most of Russia (as opposed to N. virginiana which requires a warm climate), it was more readily and cheaply available, and did not depend on transport in a country with an underdeveloped road network and climatic portage problems. This remained the case until ordinary tobacco became widely available in the 20th century. During Soviet times, rustic tobacco was an important industrial crop of agriculture. In those times, dozens of varieties were bred, some of them considered equal in quality to N. virginiana. In modern times, makhorka is still sometimes smoked by peasants and farmers due to its high availability and being almost free for them.

Vietnam

The plant is called Thuốc lào in Vietnam, and is most commonly smoked after a meal on a full stomach to "aid indigestion", or along with green tea or local beer (most commonly the cheap bia hơi). A "rít" of thuốc lào is followed by a flood of nicotine to the bloodstream inducing strong dizziness that lasts several seconds. Heavy cigarette smokers have had trouble with the intense volume of smoke and the high nicotine content; side effects include nausea and vomiting.

There are many “brands” of tobacco, most of which are specific to the region in which they are grown. Some of these “brands” are mellow in flavor and effect, some are more energizing, and some are known for their relaxing properties. 

Water pipes can be found everywhere, and are a fixture of local tea booths, eateries, and cafes. It is common to find a table with a small box of tobacco at these establishments from which anyone can help themselves to a bowl during a tea or work break. 

Travelers have made the mistake of hitting these pipes too hard on their first attempt, leading to them passing out, much to the delight and amusement of the locals. It is not uncommon for locals to offer the pipe to a foreigner in hopes of seeing the powerful effect the tobacco has on the uninitiated. 

The main difference between smoking thuốc lào and the use of other tobaccos is in the method of consumption, in that thuốc lào is consumed with a water pipe. The smoker is presented with either a bamboo pipe called a điếu cày (English: "farmer's pipe") or a ceramic hookah called a điếu bát. It may also occasionally be smoked in a more uncommon pipe known as a điếu ống. The pipe is filled with an appropriate amount of water and a small amount of thuốc lào is pressed into the bowl.

One then ignites the tobacco and inhales to create a body of smoke inside the pipe, before exhaling the smoke, reversing the process of air in the pipe by blowing into it to pop out the tobacco. The smoker then sharply inhales, usually tilting the pipe upwards to an almost horizontal position (but not completely, as the water would drain into the mouth).

Turkey
Maraş otu (English: Maraş weed) is a chewing variant of Nicotiana rustica commonly used by people who live in Maraş, Turkey and other areas of the country. Maraş Otu is a mixture of Oak tree ash and Nicotiana rustica that resembles henna.  They use this by putting the mixture under their lips like Swedish snus or Afghan naswar. It is recognized as a drug by anti-drug activists. It can contribute to mouth cancers.

Sudan
In Sudan, this type of tobacco is called toombak.  It has been used for over 400 years. Being smokeless tobacco, it is processed in the loose form and the ground powder is mixed with sodium bicarbonate. As such, it has a very strong pH and is highly addictive.

References

Entheogens
rustica
Herbal and fungal stimulants
Plant toxin insecticides
Tobacco
Plants described in 1753
Taxa named by Carl Linnaeus
Crops originating from Peru